Andrey A. Varlamov (born 25 April 1954) is an Italian physicist of Ukrainian origin. He is a principal investigator at the Institute of Superconductors, Oxides and Other Innovative Materials and Devices (SPIN-CNR) in Rome, Italy.

Early life and education
Andrey Varlamov was born on 25 April 1954 in Kiev, Ukraine. In 1971 he graduated from Kyiv Natural Science Lyceum No. 145. The same year, he was admitted to the Moscow Institute of Physics and Technology and got his master's degree cum laude from the Landau Institute six years later. Immediately after, he started the Ph.D. program under the supervision of A.A. Abrikosov at the Moscow Institute of Steel and Alloys and received his Ph.D. in condensed matter physics in 1980. At the same university he was awarded his Habilitatus (Doctor of physical and mathematical sciences) in 1988.

Professional career
From 1981 to 1999 he worked as a researcher, senior researcher (1985), associated (1987) and full professor (1990) at the Department of Theoretical Physics in Moscow Institute of Steel and Alloys. In 1993 he became an invited fellow at the Condensed Matter Theory Group of Argonne National Laboratory in United States and then starting from 1996 worked as an invited professor at first at the University of Rome Tor Vergata and then from 1997 to 2000 held the same position at both University of Bordeaux and the University of Florence. From 1999 to 2005 he was a visiting professor at the University of Minnesota and the Pavia. At the University of Rome Tor Vergata he is an adjunct professor to this day. Since 1999 he works as a research director at the Institute of Superconductors, Oxides and other Innovative Materials and Devices of the Italian National Research Council (SPIN-CNR).

In 2018 Andrey Varlamov and Andreas Glatz had written a what became known as the Perfect Pizza equation.

Honorable titles
In 2009 he was elected as correspondent member of the Istituto Lombardo Accademia di Scienze e Lettere Brera.
In 2011 he was awarded the degree of Doctor of Honoris Causa at the Bogolyubov Institute for Theoretical Physics.

In 2014 he was honored with the degree of  Doctor of Honoris Causa at the Mediterranean Institute of Fundamental Physics.
Since 1985 he is a member of the Editorial Board (1986-1992 vice-editor-in-chief) of the popular scientific journal for students Kvant of the Russian Academy of Sciences.

Awards
1971 – First Prize in the Vth International Physics Olympiad (IPhO)
1986 – Lenin Komsomol Prize in Physics (USSR State Prize for young scientists) 
2015 – Le Prix Roberval Grand Public for the book Le kaleidoscope de la Physique (in co-authorship with Attilio Rigamonti and Jacques Villain)
2016 – Honored Scholar of the Russian Federation

Books
1984 – Энциклопедический словарь юного физика
1987/2002/2005/2014/2017 - Удивительная физика
1997 – Fisica, che meraviglia!
1997 – Fluctuation Phenomena in High Temperature Superconductors
2001/2004/2012 Wonders of Physics
2002/2009 – The Physics of Superconductors
2005/2009 – Theory of Fluctuations in Superconductors
2007 – Теория флуктуаций в сверхпроводниках
2007 – Magico Caleidiscopio della Fisica
2011 – Fundamentals of Superconducting Nanoelectronics
2011 – Maravillas De La Fisica
2014 – Wonders of Physics (Chinese)
2014 – Le kaleidoscope de la Physique
2016 – Wonders of Physics I (Japanese)
2017 – Wonders of Physics II (Japanese)
2020 – Несамовита фізика. Скрипка, піца, вино і надпровідність

References

Publications

1954 births
Living people
Scientists from Kyiv
20th-century Italian physicists
Landau Institute for Theoretical Physics alumni
Moscow Institute of Physics and Technology alumni
Academic staff of the University of Bordeaux
Academic staff of the University of Florence
University of Minnesota faculty
Academic staff of the University of Pavia
Academic staff of the University of Rome Tor Vergata
21st-century Italian physicists
Soviet physicists